This is an alphabetical list of artists who reached the number one position on the United States Billboard Mainstream Rock chart, which has been active since 1981. The number in parentheses indicates the total of number-one hits for that band on this chart.

0-9
3 Doors Down (5)
 Johnny 3 Tears (1)
.38 Special (2)

A

B

C

D

E
Eurythmics (1)
Everclear (1)
Everlast (1)
Extreme (1)

F

G

H
Rob Halford (1)
Sammy Hagar (2)
Halestorm (6)
Heart (1)
Don Henley (4)
Highly Suspect (3)
Bruce Hornsby (2)

I
Billy Idol (1)
INXS (1)
I Prevail (2)

J
Mick Jagger (2)
Jefferson Starship (1)
Jelly Roll (1)
Jet (1)
Joan Jett (1)
Ayron Jones (1)
Danko Jones (1)
Journey (1)

K
Myles Kennedy (2)
Kiss (1)
Korn (1)
Lenny Kravitz (2)
Chad Kroeger (2)

L
Aaron Lewis (1)
Huey Lewis and the News (3)
Linkin Park (9)
Little Feat (2)
Live (1)

M

N
Nickelback (8)
Stevie Nicks (2)
Nirvana (1)
Randy Newman (1)
Nothing More (1)

O
Ric Ocasek (1)
The Offspring (3)
Ozzy Osbourne (4)

P

Q
Quarterflash (1)
Queensrÿche (1)

R

S

T
Tantric (1)
Corey Taylor (1)
Kim Thayil (1)
Theory of a Deadman (4)
Three Days Grace (17)
Tonic (1)
Tool (1)
Trapt (2)
Tommy Tutone (1)

U
U2 (7)

V
Van Halen (13)
Stevie Ray Vaughan (1)
Velvet Revolver (2)
Volbeat (10)

W
The Wallflowers (1)
Joe Walsh (1)
Scooter Ward (1)
The Who (1)
Steve Winwood (4)
Zakk Wylde (1)

X

Y
Yes (3)
Young Guns (1)

Z
Zac Brown Band (1)
ZZ Top (6)

References

Mainstream Rock